Hilden station is located in the city of Hilden in the German state of North Rhine-Westphalia. It is on the Düsseldorf–Solingen line and is classified by Deutsche Bahn as a category 4 station.  It is served by Rhine-Ruhr S-Bahn line S 1 every 20 minutes and three bus routes (O3, 783 and 784), operated by Rheinbahn, each at 20-minute intervals.

Since December of 2022, the Station is also served hourly by regional service RE 47 between Düsseldorf Hauptbahnhof and Remscheid-Lennep, operated by Regiobahn.

References

Footnotes

Sources

Rhine-Ruhr S-Bahn stations
S1 (Rhine-Ruhr S-Bahn)